Hanjan may refer to:
 Hanjan, Isfahan (هنجن - Hanjan)
 Hanjan, Kerman (هنجان - Hanjān)
Hanjan, Kulgam   (هنجان-  "Hanjan")